Agdistis is a genus of moths in the family Pterophoridae described by Jacob Hübner in 1825. It is the only genus in the Agdistinae subfamily which was described by J. W. Tutt in 1907.

Species

Agdistis aberdareana Arenberger, 1988
Agdistis adactyla (Hübner, [1819])
Agdistis adenensis Amsel, 1961
Agdistis africana Arenberger, 1996
Agdistis americana Barnes & Lindsey, 1921
Agdistis arabica Amsel, 1958
Agdistis arenbergeri Gielis, 1986
Agdistis asthenes Bigot, 1970
Agdistis bellissima Arenberger, 1975
Agdistis bennetti (Curtis, 1833)
Agdistis betica Arenberger, 1978
Agdistis bifurcatus Agenjo, 1952
Agdistis bigoti Arenberger, 1976
Agdistis bouyeri Gielis, 2008
Agdistis cappadociensis Fazekas, 2000
Agdistis caradjai Arenberger, 1975
Agdistis cathae Arenberger, 1999
Agdistis chardzhouna Arenberger, 1997
Agdistis clara Arenberger, 1986
Agdistis cretifera Meyrick, 1909
Agdistis criocephala Meyrick, 1909
Agdistis cypriota Arenberger, 1983
Agdistis dahurica Zagulajev, 1994
Agdistis danutae Kovtunovich & Ustjuzhanin, 2009
Agdistis darwini Arenberger, 2009
Agdistis dentalis Arenberger, 1986
Agdistis desertorum Arenberger, 1999
Agdistis dicksoni Kovtunovich & Ustjuzhanin, 2009
Agdistis dimetra Meyrick, 1924
Agdistis eberti Arenberger, 2009
Agdistis endrodyi Kovtunovich & Ustjuzhanin, 2009
Agdistis espunae Arenberger, 1978
Agdistis facetus Bigot, 1969
Agdistis falkovitshi Zagulajev, 1986
Agdistis flavissima Caradja, 1920
Agdistis frankeniae (Zeller, 1847)
Agdistis furcata Arenberger, 1996
Agdistis gerasimovi Zagulajev & Blumental, 1994
Agdistis gibberipennis Arenberger, 1996
Agdistis gittia Arenberger, 1988
Agdistis glaseri Arenberger, 1978
Agdistis hakimah Arenberger, 1985
Agdistis halodelta Meyrick, 1925
Agdistis hartigi Arenberger, 1973
Agdistis heydeni (Zeller, 1852)
Agdistis huemeri Arenberger, 2002
Agdistis hulli Gielis, 1998
Agdistis incisa Arenberger & Buchsbaum, 2000
Agdistis infumata Meyrick, 1912
Agdistis ingens Christoph, 1887
Agdistis insidiatrix Meyrick, 1933
Agdistis intermedia Caradja, 1920
Agdistis iranica Alipanah & Ustjuzhanin, 2006
Agdistis jansei Kovtunovich & Ustjuzhanin, 2009
Agdistis karabachica Zagulajev, 1990
Agdistis karakalensis Zagulajev, 1990
Agdistis karischi Arenberger, 1996
Agdistis kazakhstanicus Ustjuzhanin & Kovtunovich, 2014
Agdistis kenyana Arenberger, 1988
Agdistis korana Arenberger, 1988
Agdistis krooni Kovtunovich & Ustjuzhanin, 2009
Agdistis kruegeri Kovtunovich & Ustjuzhanin, 2009
Agdistis linnaei Gielis, 2008
Agdistis lomholdti Gielis, 1990
Agdistis maghrebi Arenberger, 1976
Agdistis malitiosa Meyrick, 1909
Agdistis malleana Arenberger, 1988
Agdistis manicata Staudinger, 1859
Agdistis melitensis Amsel, 1954
Agdistis meridionalis (Zeller, 1847)
Agdistis meyi Arenberger, 2008
Agdistis meylaniella Arenberger, 1972
Agdistis minima Walsingham, 1900
Agdistis morini Huemer, 2001
Agdistis murgabica Zagulajev & Blumental, 1994
Agdistis namibiana Arenberger, 1988
Agdistis nanodes Meyrick, 1906
Agdistis neglecta Arenberger, 1976
Agdistis nigra Amsel, 1955
Agdistis notabilis Gielis & Karsholt, 2009
Agdistis obstinata Meyrick, 1920
Agdistis olei Arenberger, 1976
Agdistis omani Arenberger, 2008
Agdistis pala Arenberger, 1986
Agdistis paralia (Zeller, 1847)
Agdistis parvella Amsel, 1958
Agdistis picardi Bigot, 1964
Agdistis piccolo Gielis, 1990
Agdistis potgieteri Kovtunovich & Ustjuzhanin, 2009
Agdistis protai Arenberger, 1973
Agdistis protecta Arenberger, 1999
Agdistis pseudocanariensis Arenberger, 1973
Agdistis pustulalis Walker, 1864
Agdistis pygmaea Amsel, 1955
Agdistis quagga Arenberger, 2009
Agdistis qurayyahiensis Gielis, 2008
Agdistis reciprocans Meyrick, 1924
Agdistis riftvalleyi Arenberger, 2001
Agdistis rubasiensis Zagulajev, 1985
Agdistis sabokyi Fazekas, 2000
Agdistis salsolae Walsingham, 1908
Agdistis sanctaehelenae (E. Wollaston, 1879)
Agdistis satanas Millière, 1875
Agdistis sissia Arenberger, 1987
Agdistis sphinx Walsingham, 1907
Agdistis spinosa Arenberger, 1986
Agdistis swakopi Arenberger, 2009
Agdistis symmetrica Amsel, 1955
Agdistis takamukui Nohira, 1919
Agdistis tamaricis (Zeller, 1847)
Agdistis tenera Arenberger, 1976
Agdistis tigrovaja Arenberger, 2001
Agdistis tihamae Arenberger, 1999
Agdistis toliarensis Bigot, 1987
Agdistis tsumkwe Arenberger, 2001
Agdistis tugai Altermatt, 2008
Agdistis turkestanica Zagulajev, 1990
Agdistis uncirectangula Hao & Li, 2003
Agdistis unguica Arenberger, 1988
Agdistis varii Kovtunovich & Ustjuzhanin, 2009
Agdistis yemenica Arenberger, 1999
Agdistis zhengi Hao & Li, 2007

References

Agdistinae
Moth genera
Taxa named by Jacob Hübner